"#Cookie Jar" (Hashtag Cookie Jar) is a song by South Korean girl group Red Velvet, taken from their debut Japanese extended play of the same title, #Cookie Jar (2018).

Background and composition 
It was reported that Red Velvet will have their Japan debut on July after Japan Nikkan Sports and Sankei Sports reported that the group had its first Japanese conference at the Sports Plaza in Musashino, Tokyo. Red Velvet confirmed themselves that they will officially debut in Japan during their Redmare concert tour.

Musically, "#Cookie Jar" was described as a song that has "groovy bassline and uptempo, twinkling electro-pop melody" that recalls Rookie.

Reception 
Following its initial release, "#Cookie Jar" was met with mixed reviews from music critics. Lee Gi-eun of TV Daily called the track "addicting", further adding that "even if you only listen to it once, the merriness of the Red Velvet songs is there". Writing for Billboard, Tamar Herman described the track that "leads up to its funky earworm of a chorus".

Music video 
The music video features the group members dressed in cute pastel-style outfits and original accessories, showing off unrealistic comic visuals. Following the music video's release, Seok Tae-jin of Insight Korea described the group's "unique, fresh, and bubbly charms", further praising the video for its "dazzling visuals.". Tamar Herman of Billboard noted Red Velvet's "similarly bubbly, bathing the fivesome in retro looks inspired by the '60s, '70s, and '80s" music video theme.

Credits and personnel 
Credits adapted from the liner notes of #Cookie Jar and Bloom.

Studio

 MonoTree Studio – recording
 SM Yellow Tail Studio – mixing
 Sterling Sound – mastering

Personnel

 Red Velvet (Irene, Seulgi, Wendy, Joy, Yeri) – vocals, background vocals
 MEG.ME – lyrics
 Efraim Faramir Sixten Fransesco Vindalf Cederqvist Leo – composition
 Mats Koray Genc – composition
 Gavin Jones – composition
 Saima Iren Mian – composition
 Ronny Vidar Svendsen – composition
 Anne Judith Stokke Wik – composition
 Nermin Harambasic – composition
 Hyun Hwang – vocal directing, Pro Tools operation, digital editing, recording
 Keita Joko – digital editing
 Jong-pil Gu (BeatBurger) – mixing
 Chris Gehringer – mastering

Charts

Weekly charts

Release history

Notes

References 

2018 singles
2018 songs
Japanese-language songs
Red Velvet (group) songs
SM Entertainment singles
Avex Group singles